The commune of Bisoro is a commune of Mwaro Province in central Burundi. The capital lies at the village Bisoro.

References

Communes of Burundi
Mwaro Province